Sklodowska is a crater on Mars, located in the Mare Acidalium quadrangle. It was named after Polish chemist and first female Nobel Laureate Marie Skłodowska Curie (1867–1934). The naming was approved in 1973, by the International Astronomical Union's Working Group for Planetary System Nomenclature.

Gallery 

Pictures of Sklodowska show numerous branched channels along its rim.  Some are visible in the pictures below.

See also 
 Impact event
 List of craters on Mars
 Mare Acidalium quadrangle
 Ore resources on Mars
 Planetary nomenclature
 Water on Mars

References 
 

Impact craters on Mars
Mare Acidalium quadrangle